Gnash may refer to:

Gnash (software), a Flash (SWF) media player
Gnash (musician) (born 1993), American DJ
Gnash (mascot), the mascot of Nashville Predators in NHL

See also
 Nash (disambiguation)
 Ganache, a mixture of chocolate and cream